Davutoğlu is a Turkish surname. Its literal meaning is "son of Davut", which is similar to that of the Bosnian surname Dautović and the Albanian family name Dauti. Notable people with the name include:	
Ahmet Davutoğlu (born 1959), Turkish politician

References

	
	
Turkish-language surnames
Patronymic surnames
Surnames from given names